The Diocese of Jalapa is a Latin Church ecclesiastical territory or diocese of the Catholic Church in southeastern Guatemala. It is a suffragan diocese in the ecclesiastical province of the metropolitan Archdiocese of Santiago de Guatemala.

Its Marian cathedral is Catedral Nuestra Señora de la Expectación in the episcopal see of Jalapa. The diocesan patron is Santa Cruz (the Holy Cross).

History 
It was erected on 10 March 1951, on territory split off from the Archdiocese of Guatemala, which remains its metropolitan.

On 25 January 2016 it lost territory to erect the Diocese of San Francisco de Asís de Jutiapa as fellow suffragan of the Archdiocese of Guatemala.

Bishops
 Miguel Angel García y Aráuz (1951.04.11 – retired 1987.01.29), previously Titular Bishop of Sophene (1944.05.16 – 1951.04.11) & Auxiliary Bishop of Archdiocese of Guatemala (Guatemala) (1944.05.16 – 1951.04.11); also Apostolic Administrator of Zacapa (Guatemala) (1951 – 1955.11.30)
 Jorge Mario Avila del Aguila, Lazarists (C.M.) (1987.01.29 – retired 2001.12.05), previously Apostolic Administrator of El Petén (Guatemala) (1978.02.03 – 1984.02.03), Titular Bishop of Nasai (1982.12.03 – 1987.01.29), Apostolic Vicar of El Petén (Guatemala) (1984.02.03 – 1987.01.29) 
 Julio Edgar Cabrera Ovalle (5 December 2001 – 30 March 2020), previously Bishop of Quiché (Guatemala) (1986.10.31 – 2001.12.05)
 José Benedicto Moscoso Miranda (30 March 2020 – present)

Other priests of this diocese who became bishops
Gabriel Peñate Rodríguez, appointed Vicar Apostolic of Izabal in 2004
Ángel Antonio Recinos Lemus. appointed Bishop of Zacapa y Santo Cristo de Esquipulas in 2016

References

External links 
 GigaCatholic, with incumbent biography links
 

Roman Catholic dioceses in Guatemala
Christian organizations established in 1951
Roman Catholic dioceses and prelatures established in the 20th century
1951 establishments in Guatemala
Roman Catholic Ecclesiastical Province of Santiago de Guatemala